Following is a list of Beat the Star episodes, from the British game show which aired on television network ITV for two series from 2008 to 2009.

Episode list
 – indicates the candidate won
 – indicates the celebrity won

Unbroadcast pilot

Series 1

Series 2
Series 2 began on 19 April 2009 and contains seven episodes. The jackpot now always stands at £50,000. If the celebrity wins, the money for that show is rolled over to the final show of the series where host Vernon Kay will go head to head against a mystery celebrity guest with the winner donating the money that is in the prize pot to charity.

Scores

Notes

References

Lists of British non-fiction television series episodes